Paratephritis is a genus of tephritid  or fruit flies in the family Tephritidae.

Species
Paratephritis abstractus Munro, 1935
Paratephritis formosensis Shiraki, 1933
Paratephritis fukaii Shiraki, 1933
Paratephritis incomposita Munro, 1957
Paratephritis karura Munro, 1957
Paratephritis takeuchii Ito, 1949
Paratephritis transitoria (Rohdendorf, 1934)
Paratephritis umbrifera Munro, 1957
Paratephritis unifasciata Chen, 1938
Paratephritis vitreifasciata (Hering, 1938)
Paratephritis xenia Hering, 1938

References

Tephritinae
Tephritidae genera
Diptera of Asia
Diptera of Africa